Shahinaz Gawish, is an Egyptian TV presenter. She is known as a former presenter of the TV show Sabah El Kheir Ya Masr (7 O'Clock) where she talked about news of the day. The TV show presents a variety of events. It is comprehensive for all conditions in Egypt, as it has many sections, including news, sports, tourism, agriculture, and weather.

Early life 
Shahinaz obtained a Bachelor's degree in mass communication, radio and television department, from Misr University for Science and Technology, She also took the 36th Military Media Course from Nasser Military Academy.

Career
Shahinaz presented several programs on Al Oula, the national Egyptian channel owned by ERTU, She also presented her own program Sabah El Kheir Ya Masr from 2012 until 2017, which was shown on Al Oula, and presented the new version of it from 2018 to 2020 as the main presenter of the program, in conjunction with TV presenter Tamer Shaltout, on weekdays. She was chosen by Minister Osama Heikal, the former Minister of Ministry of Information, to develop the program's format, and she is now presenting the TV show Sabahna Masry

She joined the Egyptian National Media Authority in 2009 and presented the weather and sports bulletin for years.

She also presented a series of conferences attended by ministers, officials and elites from the Egyptian state, including the African Food and Nutritional Conference in the presence of Prime Minister Dr. Mostafa Madbouly.

TV programs
 Presenter of the news and weather bulletin on Al Oula Egypt channel
 Presenter of the TV show Ala El-Bahr
 Presenter of the TV show Aqsa Soraa
 Presenter of the TV show Saharaat El-Eid
 Presenter of the TV show Flash on Nile Drama Channel
 Presenter of the TV show Kalam Elyoum
 Presenter of the TV show Sabah El Kheir Ya Masr from 2012 to 2017
 Presenter of the TV show Sabah El Kheir Ya Masr after developing the program's format from 2018 to 2020
 Presenter of the TV show Misaha lilra'aa
 Presenter of the TV show Sabahna Masry

References

Living people
Egyptian television presenters
Egyptian women television presenters
Mass media people from Cairo
Year of birth missing (living people)